Mark Kozelek Sings Christmas Carols is a Christmas album by American singer-songwriter Mark Kozelek. It was released on November 4, 2014, through Kozelek's own record label, Caldo Verde Records.

Background
All songs were recorded by Mark Kozelek in November–December 2013 in San Francisco. The album was announced in December 2013.

Critical reception

Upon its release, Sings Christmas Carols received positive reviews from music critics. At Metacritic, which assigns a normalized rating out of 100 to reviews from critics, the album received an average score of 76, which indicates "generally favorable reviews", based on 9 reviews. Exclaim! critic Cam Lindsay wrote: "While Sings Christmas Carols could provide any miserable person some relief at Christmastime, it also works nicely for anyone who loves these songs to hear someone other than Michael Bublé or Justin Bieber sing them." Andy Gill of The Independent stated that "it's the gap between his character and the songs’ sentiments that gives this album its curious appeal."

Barry Nicolson of NME commented: "The Sun Kil Moon frontman may revel in the role of indie-rock’s great white grinch, but as Sings Christmas Carols proves, he’s no more immune to the spirit of the season than his furry green counterpart was." Pitchfork critic Mark Richardson noted: " It’s just voice and guitar throughout, but Kozelek’s nylon string work is consistently engaging, even as he falls back on some of his go-to fingerpicking patterns." Maria Schurr of PopMatters compared the album to Sun Kil Moon's 2014 album, Benji, describing it as "an album that operates in places and moods we may not always feel comfortable venturing into or putting on, but works wonders for personal and spiritual growth."

Track listing

Personnel
 Mark Kozelek – performance, production, photography
 Joshua Raoul Brody – piano (14)
 Nathan Winter – engineering
 Brian Azer – design

References

External links
 

Mark Kozelek albums
2014 Christmas albums
Albums produced by Mark Kozelek
Caldo Verde Records albums
Christmas albums by American artists
Covers albums
Folk rock Christmas albums